This is a list of awards and nominations received by Chinese actress Xu Jinglei.

Film

Beijing College Student Film Festival

Chinese American Film Festival

China Film Director's Guild Awards

Chinese Film Media Awards

Golden Rooster Awards

Golden Phoenix Awards

Hong Kong Society of Cinematographers Awards

Huabiao Awards

Hundred Flowers Awards

Macau International Movie Festival

San Sebastian International Film Festival

References

Xu Jinglei